Elizabeth Morehead is an American actress.

Her television performances include the 1992 Seinfeld episode, "The Pez Dispenser", where she played Noel, a professional pianist and the girlfriend of George Costanza. From 1996 to 1998, she starred as Dr. Jennifer Daulton on the revival of Flipper. Soon after, she landed the role of Karen Blake, the mother of a multicultural group of adopted children, on the NBC Saturday morning sitcom One World, which ran from 1998 to 2001.

Morehead also appeared in ER, The Pretender, Judging Amy, Without A Trace, Law & Order: SVU, NCIS, and she had a co-starring role in Quints, a Disney Channel Original Movie, as Nancy Grover.

In 1983, Morehead graduated from Rhodes College with a B.A. in International Relations.

External links

Year of birth missing (living people)
Living people
American television actresses
Rhodes College alumni
21st-century American women